The Statistics Division of the Government of Pakistan, also known as Statistics Division, is a Government of Pakistan's executive and federal department, which is mandate to frames policies for development of statistical services in the country. The Department provides solid statistical base to national and international planners, policy makers, researchers and other data users in various socio-economic sectors. The Division was established on May 20, 2003, with an advice of noted statisticians and mathematicians to the Government of Pakistan. At first, the Statistics Division was established under the technical directions Scientist Emeritus of PAEC, dr. Asghar Qadir.

The Statistic Division is part of the Ministry of Finance of the Government of Pakistan which also contains the Federal Bureau of Statistics, a major source of data about Pakistan, its demographics, and its economy.

References

External links
Statistics Division

Pakistan federal departments and agencies
Government agencies established in 2003
2003 establishments in Pakistan